NGC 1309 is a spiral galaxy located approximately 120 million light-years away, appearing in the constellation Eridanus. It is about 75,000 light-years across, and is about 3/4s the width of the Milky Way. Its shape is classified as SA(s)bc, meaning that it has moderately wound spiral arms and no ring.
Bright blue areas of star formation can be seen in the spiral arms, while the yellowish central nucleus contains older-population stars. NGC 1309 is one of over 200 members of the Eridanus Group of galaxies.

Supernova 2002fk
SN 2002fk was discovered jointly by Reiki Kushida of the Yatsugatake South Base Observatory, Nagano Prefecture, Japan; and Jun-jie Wang and Yu-Lei Qiu of the Beijing Astronomical Observatory on Sept. 17.719 UT.
When it was discovered it was magnitude ~15.0; it was estimated to have reached maximum magnitude of ~13.0 before fading away. It was a Type Ia supernova (i.e., the progenitor star was white dwarf). White dwarfs are older stars that have used up almost all of their main fuel (the lighter elements such as hydrogen and helium). SN 2002fk's spectra showed no indications of hydrogen, helium or carbon; instead ionized calcium, silicon, iron and nickel were found.

Supernova 2012Z

SN 2012Z was discovered jointly by S. B. Cenko, W. Li, and A. V. Filippenko using the Katzman Automatic Imaging Telescope on January 29.15 UT as part of the Lick Observatory Supernova Search. The scientists have hypothesized that this is a type Iax supernova, and may have left behind a remnant zombie star. In February 2022 a study with new observations has confirmed that the star survived the explosion and is even brighter than before.

References

External links
 

Unbarred spiral galaxies
Eridanus (constellation)
Eridanus Group
1309
012626